The 1974 Five Nations Championship was the forty-fifth series of the rugby union Five Nations Championship. Including the previous incarnations as the Home Nations and Five Nations, this was the eightieth series of the northern hemisphere rugby union championship. Ten matches were played between 19 January and 16 March. It was contested by England, France, Ireland, Scotland and Wales. The championship was won by Ireland, the team's eighth outright title (seven other titles had been shared with other teams).

This was the first time ever that two games were played on the same weekend. This was brought in after the request from some teams, who complained that they had to always play early on in the year when bad weather prevailed, but others played in March, when the weather was better.

To get round this problem, the new format saw each team play each other's fixtures in a rotational period of scheduling. As an example, Scotland played England last in 1975, 1980, 1985. In 1976, 1981, 1986, 1991, the Scotland v England fixture was on the second weekend.

The 1974 tournament was closely contested with three of the matches ending in draws. Ireland topped the table after four rounds but had to sit out the final round of matches. Both France and Wales had chances to win the title, but both lost their last games. Welsh winger J. J. Williams appeared to score a winning try late in their game against England, but it was disallowed by referee John West, an Irishman, leading singer and Welsh rugby fan Max Boyce to compose a song about "blind Irish referees".

Participants
The teams involved were:

Table

Squads

Results

External links
1974 Five Nations Results

The official RBS Six Nations Site

References

1974
1974 rugby union tournaments for national teams
1973–74 in Irish rugby union
1973–74 in English rugby union
1973–74 in Welsh rugby union
1973–74 in Scottish rugby union
1973–74 in French rugby union
 
Five Nations
Five Nations
Five Nations